Alphabetical index of articles about the Yazidis, and their history and culture. 

The Yazidis are a minority religious group found chiefly in northern Iraq. Their religion, Yazidism, blends ancient Mesopotamian beliefs with aspects of Islam and Christianity. Throughout history, the Yazidis have experienced numerous persecutions and discrimination, including genocides committed by the Ottoman Empire and the Islamic State group. Due to these events, many Yazidis have been displaced, and the community continues to face many struggles.

Most Yazidis still live in northern Iraq, particularly in the Nineveh Governorate, though there are also smaller communities in other countries such as Armenia, Georgia, Syria, and Turkey. There are also some Yazidi diaspora communities in other nations, such as Sweden, the United Kingdom, Germany, and the United States. These communities have formed due to the repeated violence and persecution that the Yazidis have faced, forcing many to flee their homes and seek refuge elsewhere.

0-9

 1935 Yazidi revolt
 1995 Zakho bombing
 2007 Yazidi communities bombings
 2011 Duhok riots

A

 Abdullah Shrem
 Abovyan
 Ain Sifni
 Aknalich
 Aknashen
 Alagyaz
 Ali Atalan
 Amadin
 Amar Suloev
 Amasia, Armavir
 Amin Farhan Jejo
 Amirkhan Mori
 Apaga, Armenia
 April 2007 Yazidi massacre
 Arab Shamilov
 Aragats, Aragatsotn
 Araks, Armavir
 Araks, Vagharshapat
 Ararat (village), Armenia
 Aratashen
 Arazap
 Arevik
 Arevut
 Arinj
 Armenian–Kurdish relations
 Arshaluys
 Artashar
 Artashat, Armenia
 Artashavan
 Arzni
 Asayîşa Êzîdxanê
 Ashtarak
 Aslan Usoyan
 Avshen
 Aygeshat, Armavir
 Aziz Tamoyan

B

 Baadre
 Babirah
 Baghramyan, Ararat
 Bahçecik, Sur
 Bahzani
 Balaban, Nusaybin
 Balahovit
 Bambakashat
 Bashiqa
 Batel
 Batifa
 Battle of Zakho
 Bazmaghbyur
 Beban
 Berdik
 Berkashat
 Beşpınar, Beşiri
 Borek, Iraq
 Bozan, Iraq
 Bozca
 Burç

C

 Çayırlı, Midyat
 Charchakis
 Çilesiz, Nusaybin
 Claudius Rich

D

 Dalal Khario
 Dalshad Said
 Darkar
 Dayrabun
 Ddmasar
 December 2014 Sinjar offensive
 Değirmencik, Nusaybin
 Delal Bridge
 Deq (tattoo)
 Deveboynu, Beşiri
 Dian, Armenia
 Dibek, Nusaybin
 Dinçkök
 Dohula
 Dughata
 Dugure
 Duhok International Airport
 Duhok SC
 Duhok Stadium
 Duhok
 Düzen Tekkal

E

 Emanuel Hana Shaleta
 Emerîkê Serdar
 Emînê Evdal
 Emirate of Kilis
 Erdewan Zaxoyî
 Eskerê Boyîk
 Eyaz Zaxoyî
 Ezdina Mir
 Ezidi Mirza
 Êzîdxan Protection Force
 Êzîdxan Women's Units

F

 Fadhil Barwari
 Farida Khalaf
 Faysh Khabur
 Feast of Ezid
 Feast of the Assembly
 Feleknas Uca
 Ferik, Armenia
 Fexredîn

G

 Gabriel
 Gathering of the spiritual
 Geghakert
 Geghanist, Ararat
 Genocide of Yazidis by the Islamic State
 Getap, Aragatsotn
 Getazat
 Ghazaravan
 Gir Zerk
 Gohbal
 Güneli, Nusaybin
 Guram Adzhoyev (footballer, born 1961)
 Güven, Midyat

H

 Hako, Aragatsotn
 Halamata Cave
 Hardan, Iraq
 Hatsashen
 Haviv Shimoni
 Haydar Shesho
 Hazim Tahsin Beg
 Heciyê Cindî
 Hemoye Shero
 Hesen Begê Cemetery
 History of the Kurds
 Hovtashat
 Human rights in Islamic State-controlled territory

I

 Ibrahim Khalil (singer)
 İkiköprü, Beşiri
 Imad Youkhana Yaqo
 Islamic State
 İsmail Özden
 It's On U

J

 Jamshlu
 Janan Sawa
 Jangir Agha
 Jassim Mohammed Haji
 Jraber
 Jrarat, Armavir
 Jrarat, Kotayk
 Jrvezh

K

 Kaleli, Nusaybin
 Kanakeravan
 Kanch
 Kaniashir
 Kassem Taher Saleh
 Khabur (Tigris)
 Khalid Mushir
 Khalil Rashow
 Khana Sor
 Khanke
 Khanna Omarkhali
 Khatarah
 Khatuna Fekhra
 Khdr Hajoyan
 Khoshaba
 Khurto Hajji Ismail
 Kızılin, Nizip
 Kocadağ, Nusaybin
 Kocho, Iraq
 Kovan Abdulraheem
 Kseniya Borodina
 Kumgeçit, Beşiri
 Kurdistan List
 Kurukavak, Beşiri
 Kuşçukuru, Beşiri
 Kyaram Sloyan

L

 Lalish
 Lamiya Haji Bashar
 Lernamerdz
 List of Yazidi holy figures
 List of Yazidi holy places
 List of Yazidi organizations
 List of Yazidi people
 List of Yazidi settlements
 Louis Raphaël I Sako
 Lukashin
 Lusakn

M

 Mağaraköy, İdil
 Mahad, Iraq
 Mahmoud Ezidi
 Mam Rashan Shrine
 Mam Rashan
 Mamuka Usubyan
 Margara
 Masis, Armenia
 Mayakovski, Armenia
 Mela Huseynê Bateyî
 Metsadzor
 Meyan Khatun
 Mijnatun
 Mikhail Aloyan
 Mirak, Armenia
 Mirza Dinnayi
 Mkhchyan
 Mrganush
 Murder of Doski Azad
 Murder of Du'a Khalil Aswad
 Musa Sor
 Myasnikyan

N

 Nadia Murad
 Nagham Nawzat
 Nalbandyan, Armenia
 Nareen Shammo
 Narsai Toma
 Nasirdîn
 Nimrud Baito
 Nineveh Governorate
 Nineveh Plains
 Nor Artagers
 Nor Geghi
 Nor Gyugh
 Noramarg
 Norashen, Ararat
 November 2015 Sinjar offensive

O

 Oğlakçı
 Oğuz, Beşiri
 Order of the Peacock Angel
 Ordîxanê Celîl
 Oshakan
 Otevan
 Oyuklu, Midyat

P

 Pascal Esho Warda
 Persecution of Yazidis by Kurds
 Persecution of Yazidis
 Pir Ali (Yazidi saint)
 Pir Mehmed Reshan
 Pîr Xidir Silêman
 Principality of Mahmudi
 Proshyan
 Pshatavan

Q

 Qatma
 Qibar
 Qiniyeh
 Quba Mêrê Dîwanê

R

 Rabia of Basra
 Ramzi Garmou
 Ranchpar
 Ravi Singh (humanitarian)
 Rewan Amin
 Ridwan (place)
 Roman Amoyan
 Rya Taza

S

 Sabunchi
 Sadunts
 Saghmosavan
 Saleh Yousefi
 Salih Jaber
 Samand Siabandov
 Seven Archangels
 Shahumyan, Armavir
 Shamiram, Armenia
 Sharaf ad-Din ibn al-Hasan
 Sharanish
 Sharfadin Temple
 Sharya, Iraq
 Shehid ibn Jerr
 Sheikh Adi ibn Musafir
 Sheikh Ali Ilyas
 Sheikh Hasan ibn Sheikh Adi II
 Sheikh Khairy Khedr
 Sheikh Mand
 Sheikh Obekr
 Sheikh Shems
 Shenavan, Aragatsotn
 Shenik, Armavir
 Shenkani
 Shir Sarim
 Shirin Hassani Ramazan
 Siba Sheikh Khidir
 Sicadîn
 Silat Bridge
 Simele District
 Simele massacre
 Simele
 Sinjar Alliance
 Sinjar massacre
 Sinjar Mountains
 Sinjar Resistance Units
 Sinjar
 Sinun
 Sipan, Armenia
 Slavery in 21st-century jihadism
 Soran Emirate
 Sorik
 Souzan Barakat
 Sreshka
 Sultan Ezid Temple
 Sultan Ezid

T

 Tahseen Said
 Tal Banat
 Tal Qasab
 Talin, Armenia
 Tandzut, Armavir
 Tatul Avoyan
 Tatul, Armenia
 Tawûsgeran
 Tawûsî Melek
 Tepeyolu
 The Last Girl (memoir)
 The Liberation of Christian and Yazidi Children of Iraq
 Til Ezer
 Tiwaf
 Tlik
 Tosinê Reşîd
 Turkish airstrikes on Sinjar (2018)
 Turkish airstrikes on Sinjar (2021)
 Tutak, Turkey

U

 Üçgül
 Üçkuyular, Beşiri
 Uğurca, Beşiri
 University of Duhok
 University of Zakho
 Usuv Beg

V

 Verin Artashat
 Verin Kalakut
 Vian Dakhil
 Vîn TV

W

 Walid Yunis Ahmad
 Wansa

X

 None

Y

 Yazda
 Yazidi Academy
 Yazidi Black Book
 Yazidi Book of Revelation
 Yazidi House
 Yazidi literature
 Yazidi Movement for Reform and Progress
 Yazidi New Year
 Yazidi social organization
 Yazidis in Armenia
 Yazidis in Georgia
 Yazidis in Germany
 Yazidis in Syria
 Yazidis
 Yazidism in Iraq
 Yazidism in Russia
 Yazidism in Turkey
 Yazidism
 Yeghegnut, Armavir
 Yemişli, Midyat
 Yenice, Midyat
 Yeraskhahun
 Yezidi National Union ULE
 Yolkonak, Beşiri
 Yolveren, Batman
 Yona Sabar

Z

 Zakhariy Kalashov
 Zakho District
 Zakho resort attack
 Zakho SC
 Zakho
 Zana Allée
 Zar, Armenia
 Zara (Russian singer)
 Zartonk
 Zembîlfiroş
 Zeravani SC
 Zorava
 Zovuni

Categories related to Yazidis

 :Category:Armenian Yazidis
 :Category:Duhok
 :Category:German Yazidis
 :Category:Iraqi Yazidis
 :Category:Mass media in Duhok
 :Category:People from Duhok
 :Category:People from Zakho
 :Category:Persecution of Yazidis by ISIL
 :Category:Persecution of Yazidis by Muslims
 :Category:Persecution of Yazidis in Iraq
 :Category:Persecution of Yazidis
 :Category:Russian Yazidis
 :Category:Simele
 :Category:Sinjar Alliance
 :Category:Syrian Yazidis
 :Category:Turkish Yazidis
 :Category:Yazidi culture
 :Category:Yazidi diaspora
 :Category:Yazidi history
 :Category:Yazidi holy days
 :Category:Yazidi holy figures
 :Category:Yazidi holy places
 :Category:Yazidi mythology
 :Category:Yazidi organizations by country
 :Category:Yazidi organizations in Iraq
 :Category:Yazidi organizations
 :Category:Yazidi people by country
 :Category:Yazidi people
 :Category:Yazidi places
 :Category:Yazidi populated places by country
 :Category:Yazidi populated places in Armenia
 :Category:Yazidi populated places in Iraq
 :Category:Yazidi populated places
 :Category:Yazidi princesses
 :Category:Yazidi religion
 :Category:Yazidi society
 :Category:Yazidi stub templates
 :Category:Yazidi stubs
 :Category:Yazidi templates
 :Category:Yazidi texts
 :Category:Yazidi traditions
 :Category:Yazidi villages by country
 :Category:Yazidi villages in Syria
 :Category:Yazidi villages in Turkey
 :Category:Yazidi villages
 :Category:Yazidi women
 :Category:Yazidis by country
 :Category:Yazidis from Georgia (country)
 :Category:Yazidis in Armenia
 :Category:Yazidis in fiction
 :Category:Yazidis in Georgia (country)
 :Category:Yazidis in Germany
 :Category:Yazidis in Iraq
 :Category:Yazidis in Russia
 :Category:Yazidis in Syria
 :Category:Yazidis in Turkey
 :Category:Zakho

Yazidi templates

 Template:Yazidi diaspora
 Template:Yazidi-stub

See also
 Under construction

References

Notes

Citations

External links
 Under construction

 
 
 
 
 
 
 
Yazidis